The Red Promenade (French:Le corso rouge) is a 1914 French silent drama film directed by Maurice Tourneur and starring Henry Roussel, Renée Sylvaire and Charles Keppens.

Cast
 Henry Roussel as Montenervio  
 Renée Sylvaire 
 Charles Keppens as Hélier de Saint-Ermont  
 Georges Paulais 
 Maryse Dauvray 
 Maïna as L'écuyère de cirque  
 Madeleine Grandjean as Henriette de St. Ermont

References

Bibliography
 Waldman, Harry. Maurice Tourneur: The Life and Films. McFarland, 2001.

External links 
 

1914 films
French drama films
French silent short films
1914 drama films
1910s French-language films
Films directed by Maurice Tourneur
Films based on French novels
French black-and-white films
1914 short films
Silent drama films
1910s French films